Øystein Vetti (born 1 February 1986) is a retired Norwegian football defender.

Growing up in Jølster IL, he represented Norway as a youth international. He joined Sogndal in 2004 and featured briefly on the first and second tier. Loaned out to Årdal FK in 2006, a lengthy spell in Førde IL would be his last career station. He retired in 2014 and played a standalone game in 2017.

Vetti became assistant coach of Førde in 2018, and continued in 2019.

References

1986 births
Living people
Norwegian footballers
People from Jølster
Sogndal Fotball players
Eliteserien players
Norwegian First Division players
Association football defenders
Norway youth international footballers
Sportspeople from Vestland